Malpractice is a 1989 Australian drama film directed by Bill Bennett. It was screened in the Un Certain Regard section at the 1989 Cannes Film Festival.

Plot
A child is born with brain damage and the mother decides to sue the doctor for malpractice.

Cast
 Caz Lederman as Coral Davis
 Bob Baines as Doug Davis
 Ian Gilmour as Dr. Frank Harrison
 Pat Thomson as Sister Margaret Beattie
 Charles Little as Dr. Tom Cotterslow
 Dorothy Alison as Maureen Davis
 Janet Stanley as Sister Diane Shaw

Production
The movie was one of a series of drama documentaries produced at Film Australia for the Nine Network dealing with social issues. It was made using improvisation. Bennett says the making of the film was extremely emotional and it remains one of his favourite films.

References

External links

1989 films
1989 drama films
1989 independent films
Australian drama films
Films directed by Bill Bennett
Australian independent films
1980s English-language films
1980s Australian films